An Waray is a party-list in the Philippines, mainly based on the islands of Leyte, Samar and Biliran.

In the 2004 elections for the House of Representatives An Waray got 268,164 votes (2.1079% of the nationwide vote) and one seat (Florencio Noel). An Waray Party List is a democratic multi-sectoral party-list organization that envisions a just, progressive and peaceful Filipino society characterized by its principles katilingban (sense of community), kahimyang (peace) and kauswagan (progress) through the adoption of a community-based and peace oriented development agenda.

Electoral performance

References 

Local political parties in the Philippines
Party-lists represented in the House of Representatives of the Philippines
Politics of Samar (province)
Politics of Eastern Samar
Politics of Northern Samar
Politics of Leyte (province)
Politics of Biliran
Regionalist parties
Regionalist parties in the Philippines